Yevgeny Konstantinovich Fyodorov (10 April (O.S. 28 March), 1910, Bendery – 30 December 1981) was a Soviet geophysicist, statesman, public figure, academician (1960), and Hero of the Soviet Union (1938).

Biography 
Yevgeny Fyodorov graduated from Leningrad State University in 1932. In 1932–1938, he was a research associate on several polar stations, including the first drifting ice station North Pole-1 (1937-1938). In 1938–1939, Yevgeny Fyodorov headed the Arctic and Antarctic Research Institute. In 1938 he joined the All-Union Communist Party (b). 

In 1939-1947 and 1962–1974, he was in charge of the Soviet Weather Service (Гидрометеослужба СССР). In 1947–1955, Yevgeny Fyodorov was employed at the Geophysics Institute of the Soviet Academy of Sciences. He was the one to establish and then head the Applied Geophysics Institute of the Soviet Weather Service.

Yevgeny Fyodorov authored numerous works dedicated to his research on the Arctic geophysical fields, water balance of clouds, artificial influence on meteorological processes, study of highest atmospheric layers with the use of satellites, pollution etc. Yevgeny Fyodorov was awarded the USSR State Prize (1946, 1969), five Orders of Lenin, Order of the October Revolution, six other orders, and several medals.

Fyodorov was the second chairman of the Soviet Peace Committee, in the years 1979–1981.

References

1910 births
1981 deaths
Burials at Novodevichy Cemetery
People from Bender, Moldova
People from Bendersky Uyezd
Central Committee of the Communist Party of the Soviet Union candidate members
First convocation members of the Soviet of Nationalities
Ninth convocation members of the Soviet of Nationalities
Tenth convocation members of the Soviet of Nationalities
Soviet geophysicists
Full Members of the USSR Academy of Sciences
Heroes of the Soviet Union
Explorers of the Arctic
Russian and Soviet polar explorers
Saint Petersburg State University alumni
Recipients of the Order of Kutuzov, 2nd class
Stalin Prize winners
Recipients of the USSR State Prize